Presidential elections were held in Peru on 13 April 1890. The result was a victory for Remigio Morales Bermúdez of the Constitutional Party, who received 68% of the vote.

Results

References

Presidential elections in Peru
Peru
1890 in Peru
Election and referendum articles with incomplete results